Giuseppe Dezza (28 February 1830 – 15 May 1898)  was an Italian general and patriot.

Biography
Dezza was born in Melegnano, Lombardy. He was a volunteer in the First Battalion of Italian Students of the provisional Lombard government of 1848, and fought in the First Italian War of Independence against the Austrian Empire which broke out that year.

In 1851 he graduated in Engineering and Architecture in Pavia. In 1859 he again enrolled as volunteer in the Cacciatori delle Alpi corps, obtaining the grade of second lieutenant and a Silver Medal for Military Value. In 1860 he took part to Giuseppe Garibaldi's Expedition of the Thousand which led to the unification of Italy, quickly reaching the grade of colonel.

In the newly formed Italian Army he obtained the command of the 29th Infantry Regiment which he led in the Battle of Custoza (1866). Two years later he became major general, at the head of the Pisa Brigade. In 1872 he was King's Field Lieutenant and, in 1877, lieutenant general, being assigned as commander of the Milano Division. In 1886 Dezza was commander of the VII Army Corps, and later of the XII, VI and III Corps.

In 1895 he was elected member of the Italian Parliament as deputy and, from 1889, senator.

He died in Milan in 1898.

In 1929 the Italian minesweeper “Pilade Bronzetti" was renamed after Dezza. It served in the Italian navy during World War II and was captured and used by the Germans after Italy's capitulation until it was sunk by the British in 1944.

Notes

References

 

1830 births
1898 deaths
People from Melegnano
Deputies of Legislature XIII of the Kingdom of Italy
Deputies of Legislature XIV of the Kingdom of Italy
Members of the Senate of the Kingdom of Italy
Politicians of Lombardy
Italian generals
Italian engineers
Members of the Expedition of the Thousand